Empire Building may refer to:
Empire Building (Melbourne)
Empire Building (Birmingham, Alabama)
Empire Building (Atlanta) or the J. Mack Robinson College of Business Administration Building at Georgia State University
Empire Building (Manhattan), a skyscraper in New York City
Empire Building (Columbus, Ohio)
 Empire Building, a 2013 album by Saint Pepsi

See also
British Empire Building, an Art Deco building in New York City
Empire Buildings, a building in Albany, Western Australia
Empire State Building, a skyscraper in New York City